Kesler Peak is a  mountain summit located in Salt Lake County, Utah, United States.

Description
Kesler Peak is set in the Wasatch Range which is a subset of the Rocky Mountains. It is situated in Big Cottonwood Canyon, on land managed by Wasatch National Forest. Salt Lake City is 13 miles to the northwest and Solitude Mountain Resort is four miles to the east. Neighbors include Mount Raymond three miles to the northwest and Gobblers Knob is 3.2 miles to the north. Precipitation runoff from the mountain's slopes drains to Big Cottonwood Creek.

History
The spelling of this mountain's toponym was officially changed in 2008 by the United States Board on Geographic Names. Prior to that it was spelled "Kessler Peak" which appears on older maps, and was also known as "Kessler's Peak" in the early 1900s. This landform is named after Frederick Kesler (1816–1899), Mormon bishop, mill architect, justice of the peace and school warden. There is another Kesler Peak (elevation 8,747 ft) located in the Oquirrh Mountains of Tooele County, Utah, which is also named after this same person.

Kesler Peak is centrally located in the Big Cottonwood Mining District. From 1867 to 1976, the Big Cottonwood and Little Cottonwood mining districts combined to produce 30,600 ounces of gold, 17.5 million ounces of silver, 4.7 million pounds of zinc, 18.1 million pounds of copper, and 252 million pounds of lead. The Carbonate Mine, situated high on the east slope of Kesler Peak, was a major producer.

Gallery

See also

References

External links

 Kesler Peak: weather forecast

Mountains of Utah
Mountains of Salt Lake County, Utah
North American 3000 m summits
Wasatch-Cache National Forest
Wasatch Range